Qaleh-ye Askar or Qaleh Askar, also rendered as Qaleh-ye Asgar and Qaleh Asgar may refer to:
 Qaleh-ye Askar, Bam
 Qaleh Askar, Bardsir
 Qaleh Asgar Rural District